Tabl may refer to:
 Tabl, Iran, a village in Hormozgan Province, Iran
 A Persian name for the Indian drums known as tabla
 A large drum from Turkey, Bulgaria, Macedonia, and the Middle East also known as davul or tapan